Page DuBois is professor of classics and comparative literature at the University of California, San Diego.  She is known for her work in Ancient Greek literature, feminist theory and psychoanalysis.

Career 
DuBois received her BA from Stanford University, and her PhD from the University of California at Berkeley. She is now professor of classics and comparative literature at the University of California, San Diego, where she is part of the literature department and the Center for Hellenic Studies.

She gave the 2018 James W. Poultney Memorial Lecture at the University of California, San Diego.

Publications 
History, Rhetorical Description and the Epic: From Homer to Spenser.  Cambridge: Boydell and Brewer, 1982. 
Centaurs and Amazons: Women and the Prehistory of the Great Chain  of Being. Ann Arbor: University of Michigan Press, 1982.  
'A Disturbance of Syntax at the Gates of Rome,' Stanford Literature Review, 2 (1985): 185-208.
Sowing the Body: Psychoanalysis and Ancient Representations of Women.  Chicago: University of Chicago Press, 1988.  
'Inscription, the Law, and the Comic Body,' Métis: Revue d'anthropologie du monde grec ancien, 3 (1988): 69-84.
Il corpo come metafora: Rappresentazioni della donna nella Grecia antica. Rome: Laterza, 1990. 
Torture and Truth. New York and London: Routledge, 1991. 
Sappho Is Burning. Chicago: University of Chicago Press, 1995. 
Trojan Horses: Saving the Classics from Conservatives. New York: New York University Press, 2001. 
Slaves and Other Objects. University of Chicago Press, 2003. 
Slavery: Antiquity and its Legacy (Ancients and Moderns). I.B.Tauris, 2009. 
Out of Athens: the new ancient Greeks. Harvard University Press, 2010. 
A Million and One Gods: The Persistence of Polytheism. Harvard University Press, 2014. 
Sappho (Understanding Classics). I.B.Tauris, 2015.

References

External links 
UC San Diego page for Page DuBois

Living people
Scholars of ancient Greek literature
University of California, San Diego faculty
Year of birth missing (living people)